The 1942 South Australian National Football League season was the first of three SANFL seasons played under reduced club numbers during World War II. The premiership was won by Port-Torrens, the merger between Port Adelaide and West Torrens. Attendances during World War II were inflated due to servicemen being granted free entry.

The Pacific theatre of World War II had escalated dramatically since the 1941 season, and Australia was heavily committed to the war effort by this time, making football a secondary consideration. Many football ovals were also taken over, impacting the ability to play or train. For much of the offseason, the prospect of league football continuing in 1942 looked unlikely. Nevertheless, the Allied Forces Welfare Coordinating Committee appealed for the SANFL to stage matches for the entertainment of troops and civilians, and in late April, only two weeks prior to the start of the season, final arrangements were made for a reduced season featuring four merged teams, each representing a pair of geographically close clubs. The competing teams were:
Port-Torrens ( and ), wearing Port Adelaide colours and known as the Magpies
Norwood-North ( and ), wearing North Adelaide colours and known as the Redlegs
Sturt-South ( and ), wearing Sturt colours and known as the Blues
West-Glenelg ( and ), wearing Glenelg colours and known as the Tigers
Each merged team would be jointly managed by committees of the individual clubs. The season was played over twelve minor rounds, followed by the major rounds played under the Page–McIntyre final four featuring all four teams.

Ladder

Grand Final

References

SANFL
South Australian National Football League seasons